Patrick Nulty (born 18 November 1982) is a teacher, university lecturer and former Irish Labour Party politician. He was elected as a Teachta Dála (TD) for Dublin West at a by-election in October 2011. He sat as an independent TD after losing the Labour Party whip on 6 December 2011. He resigned as a TD on 24 March 2014 after sending several sexually inappropriate messages to domestic abuse victims in his constituency and a 17-year-old girl.

Biography
Nulty was born and raised in Corduff near Dublin. When two weeks old, he was injured in a house fire, leaving him with burn scars on his face and arms. He attended Riversdale Community College and has a degree in social policy from Trinity College Dublin and a Masters in Social Science from University College Dublin. He worked as a social policy advisor for a homeless charity for five years. He is also a former National Chairperson of Labour Youth and was a prominent activist of the Students' Union in Trinity.

Political career

Labour Youth
A leading member of Labour Youth's re-foundation in the early 2000s, Nulty served in Labour Youth as the National Chairman, Communications Officer and Gender Equality Officer. Nulty led a campaign while in Trinity Labour Youth against the sexual harassment of female students on campus. Throughout Nulty's career in the Labour Party, he had been a vocal supporter of Labour Youth and was regular speakers at the annual Labour Youth Tom Johnson Summer School.

County Council
Nulty was elected to Fingal County Council for Labour at the 2009 local elections in the Mulhuddart local electoral area.

Dáil
He was Labour's unsuccessful second candidate for Dublin West at the 2011 general election, where running-mate Joan Burton topped the poll, but was elected as a Teachta Dála (TD) for Dublin West at a by-election in October 2011. It was the first time since 1982 that a government party candidate had won a by-election.

He was on the Labour Party's left wing, and opposed both the Lisbon Treaty and Labour's coalition deal with Fine Gael after the election. He also rejected the idea of a transfer pact with the Fine Gael candidate despite the parties' coalition. While in opposition he called on his former colleagues to legislate for the X case as had been promised by Labour for many years. Nulty voted against the VAT increase in the 2012 budget and lost the Labour Party whip as a result.

He was described as a "Labour rebel candidate" by the Irish Independent, while The Irish Times quoted the label "anti-government Government candidate" discussing his opposition to cuts in services at Blanchardstown Hospital.

On 21 June 2013, he resigned from the Labour Party.

Resignation as TD
He resigned from the Dáil on 24 March 2014 as a result of having sent inappropriate Facebook messages to a 17-year-old female, and to two other adult women. At first he denied that he was the sender of the messages, and claimed that his phone had been hacked, but subsequently admitted his behaviour when confronted with evidence that the messages had been sent from Leinster House. Nulty apologised for his behaviour and said the "message was sent while under the influence of alcohol". In September 2015 he was awarded a teaching scholarship by the University of Limerick to undertake a PhD in Politics and Public Administration. He now works full time for that university as a researcher and tutor.

References

1982 births
Living people
Alumni of Trinity College Dublin
Alumni of University College Dublin
Independent TDs
Labour Party (Ireland) TDs
Local councillors in Fingal
Members of the 31st Dáil
Politicians from Fingal